The Mount Stephen trilobite beds (UNSM locality 14s) are a series of fossil strata on Mount Stephen, British Columbia that contain exceptionally preserved fossil material.  Part of the same stratigraphic unit as the Burgess Shale deposit, many non-mineralized parts (such as anomalocarid claws, sponges, and trilobite legs) are preserved; in addition, a high density of trilobite fossils is present.

History 

The trilobite beds were the first Burgess shale locality to be discovered.

The richness of fossils in the Field area was first identified by workers associated with the construction of the Trans-Canada railway, which had (somewhat controversially) been routed through the Kicking Horse valley.  Richard McConnell, of the Geological Survey of Canada, was pointed to the beds by a railway worker whilst mapping the geology around the railway line in September 1886.  Several unusual fossils were subsequently described from this site, including sponges, worms, and the appendages of the unusual Anomalocaris, identified at that time as the bodies of crabs. These fossils prompted Charles Doolittle Walcott to make forays into the area, and led to his discovery of the Walcott Quarry on Fossil Ridge.

Stratigraphy 
The trilobite beds are in the Campsite Cliff member, and contain the marker trilobite Ogygopsis.

Location 

The strata are located on Mount Stephen in British Columbia.

References

Paleozoic paleontological sites of North America
Yoho National Park
Paleontology in Canada
Cambrian paleontological sites